

95001–95100 

|-id=008
| 95008 Ivanobertini ||  || Ivano Bertini (born 1968), Italian astronomer and active member of the Asiago-DLR Asteroid Survey, is collaborating in the planning of observations using the OSIRIS two-camera system on board the European Space Agency's Rosetta mission. His main research field is the study of the dust environment in comets. || 
|-id=016
| 95016 Kimjeongho ||  || Gim Jeong-ho (1804–1866), Korean geographer and cartographer in the early 19th century whose works represented a culmination in Korea's map-making history. The publication of three maps and three topographies is his greatest achievements. || 
|-id=020
| 95020 Nencini ||  || Erica Nencini (born 1974) earned her economics degree at the University of Pisa and is presently the CFO of SpaceDyS, a company in the aerospace sector. A valuable employee, she contributes enormously to the business development. || 
|-id=024
| 95024 Ericaellingson ||  || Erica Ellingson (born 1962), astronomer at the University of Colorado Boulder. She is an observational cosmologist, studying the origin, content and evolution of the Universe. Her speciality is clusters of galaxies, held together by the gravity of invisible dark matter. || 
|-id=072
| 95072 ČVUT ||  || The Czech Technical University in Prague (ČVUT, České vysoké učení technické) is one of the biggest and oldest technical universities in Europe. It was established at the initiative of Josef Christian Willenberg in 1707. Currently it has eight faculties, about 18 000 students, and its own nuclear reactor. || 
|}

95101–95200 

|-id=179
| 95179 Berkó || 2002 BO || Ernő Berkó (born 1955), a Hungarian amateur astronomer interested in deep-sky objects and double stars. He is an independent discoverer of the supernova 1999by, and as of Oct. 2006 the Washington Double Star Catalog contains over 160 double stars discovered by him. || 
|}

95201–95300 

|-id=219
| 95219 Borgman ||  || Dennis Borgman (born 1952), an American machinist, carpenter, electrician, plumber, programmer, and amateur astronomer, actively involved with the George Observatory and the Fort Bend Astronomy Club. || 
|-id=247
| 95247 Schalansky ||  || Judith Schalansky (born 1980) is a German writer. She has degrees in both History of Art and Communication Design. Her book Atlas of Remote Islands was the winner of The German Arts Foundation Prize for the Most Beautiful Book of The Year., German writer || 
|}

95301–95400 

|-bgcolor=#f2f2f2
| colspan=4 align=center | 
|}

95401–95500 

|-id=449
| 95449 Frederickgregory ||  || Frederick D. Gregory (born 1941) is a retired American astronaut who was the pilot on one space shuttle mission and commander on two other missions. In 1989, he was the first African American to command a space flight. He also served as Deputy Administrator at NASA. || 
|-id=474
| 95474 Andreajbarbieri ||  || Andrea J. Barbieri (born 1969), was born in the United States and educated as a telecom engineer in Italy. He worked at JPL on the UHF systems of the Mars Odyssey and Mars Explorations Rovers, and is now involved with navigation and telecommunication satellites in England. He is the recipient of NASA and ESA group awards. || 
|}

95501–95600 

|-id=593
| 95593 Azusienis ||  || Algimantas Azusienis (1930–2021), a Lithuanian astronomer and teacher for 50 years at the Vilnius Pedagogical University, has investigated the variable stars and the photometric systems. With V. Straizys he improved the determination of the response curves and parameters of the UBV system. || 
|}

95601–95700 

|-bgcolor=#f2f2f2
| colspan=4 align=center | 
|}

95701–95800 

|-id=760
| 95760 Protezionecivile ||  || The people of the Protezione Civile, the Italian Civil Protection Department, who played an essential role in the 2020 Corona pandemic in Italy. Established in 1992, the department's responsibilities include the prevention and management of emergency events such as natural disasters. || 
|-id=771
| 95771 Lachat ||  || Damien Lachat (born 1977) is an electronics engineer who works at the Swiss Federal Office of Metrology and an amateur astronomer in Jura. He is one of the founders of the Observatoire Astronomique Jurassien, near Vicques. || 
|-id=782
| 95782 Hansgraf ||  || Hans Graf (born 1949), an Austrian conductor who has directed the Houston Symphony since 2001 and has played a pivotal role in shaping the institution. He is known for his wide-ranging repertoire and creative programming. || 
|-id=785
| 95785 Csányivilmos ||  || Vilmos Csányi (born 1935) is a Hungarian biologist, biochemist, ethologist and a member of the Hungarian Academy of Sciences. His main field of research is human and animal behavior, and the questions of biological and cultural evolution. He is a very active science communicator, and the author of numerous literary novels. || 
|-id=793
| 95793 Brock ||  || Brad Brock (born 1955) is a manager with IBM Information Technology and Services. He has also been very active in local Boy Scouts of America activities in the Tucson, Arizona, area || 
|}

95801–95900 

|-id=802
| 95802 Francismuir ||  || Francis Muir (born 1926), British-American mentor and advisor of the discoverer, Joseph A. Dellinger. He has demonstrated a deft touch over seemingly endless years of applying a variety of modern mathematical notions to the simple and practical solution of problems in the earth sciences. || 
|-id=824
| 95824 Elger ||  || Thomas Gwyn Empy Elger (1836–1897) was a British selenographer who was the first Director of the Lunar Section of the British Astronomical Association. His book The Moon (1895) is considered a classic lunar observing guide for the amateur astronomers of that time. || 
|-id=851
| 95851 Stromvil ||  || The Stromvil photometric system, established in 1996 by V. Straizys, D. L. Crawford and A. G. Davis Philip as a combination of the Strömgren and Vilnius photometric systems, permits the classification of stars of all types on the basis of photometric measurements alone. || 
|-id=852
| 95852 Leatherbarrow ||  || Bill Leatherbarrow (born 1947) is professor emeritus at the University of Sheffield. He was awarded an honorary doctorate for services to amateur astronomy. He served as British Astronomical Association President from 2011 to 2013, and has been BAA Lunar Section Director since 2009. || 
|-id=853
| 95853 Jamescarpenter ||  || James Carpenter (1840–1899), was a British astronomer known for his work on stellar spectra and planets. He co-authored "The Moon: Considered as a Planet, a World, and a Satellite" with James Nasmyth. || 
|-id=882
| 95882 Longshaw || 2003 HW || Nigel Longshaw (born 1963) is a committee member of the British Astronomical Association Lunar Section and contributes to the Section Circulars. His papers have appeared in the BAA Journal and observations published in Observing the Moon by North, Observing the Moon by Wlasuk and Moon Observers Guide by Grego. || 
|-id=895
| 95895 Sebastiano ||  || Sebastiano Foglia (born 2010) is the son of Italian amateur astronomer Sergio Foglia, who co-discovered this minor planet. || 
|}

95901–96000 

|-id=928
| 95928 Tonycook ||  || Tony Cook (born 1962) is the British Astronomical Association and Association of Lunar and Planetary Observers Coordinator for Transient Lunar Phenomena. He also worked on the Mariner 10 imagery and the Clementine digital topographic map that was used during the planning of the impact of ESA's SMART-1. || 
|-id=935
| 95935 Grego ||  || Peter Grego (born 1966) is a British amateur astronomer and author of many books on observational astronomy. He currently serves as Assistant Director of the British Astronomical Association's Lunar Section. || 
|-id=939
| 95939 Thagnesland ||  || Thaddeus Vreeland (1866–1927) and Agnes Vreeland (1877–1961), maternal grandparents of the American discoverer James W. Young || 
|-id=951
| 95951 Ernestopalomba ||  || Ernesto Palomba (born 1967), an Italian planetary scientist at INAF-IAPS and discoverer of minor planets || 
|-id=954
| 95954 Bayzoltán ||  || Zoltán Lajos Bay (1900–1992) was a Hungarian physicist, university professor and engineer who developed microwave technology, including tungsten lamps. He was the president of the department of nuclear physics in the National Bureau of Standards and also an honorary member of the Hungarian Academy of Sciences || 
|-id=955
| 95955 Claragianni ||  || Clara Cagnacci (born 1933) and Giannantonio Palomba (1932–2015), the parents of the Italian discoverer Ernesto Palomba || 
|-id=959
| 95959 Covadonga ||  || Covadonga Camblor, wife of the Spanish astronomer Juan Lacruz who discovered this minor planet || 
|-id=962
| 95962 Copito ||  || Snowflake (1962–2003) represented the first known case of albinism in gorillas. In a 1967 article about the gorilla, Riopelle and Zahl gave it the name "Snowflake". The name stuck and was translated into Spanish as above and into Catalan as "Floquet de Neu". || 
|-id=980
| 95980 Haroldhill ||  || Harold Hill (1920–2005) was a well known selenographer with the British Astronomical Association's Lunar Section and is considered to have been the last of the great visual lunar cartographers. He received the BAA Merlin Medal in 1969 and is best remembered for his seminal 1991 work, Portfolio of Lunar Drawings. || 
|-id=982
| 95982 Beish ||  || Jeff Beish (born 1940) has been an avid amateur astronomer since the 1970s, serving in the Mars Section of the Association of Lunar and Planetary Observers (ALPO) from 1981–2005. He maintains the WIMP planetary ephemerides software and an excellent Mars website. In 1989 he received the ALPO Walter Haas observing award. || 
|}

References 

095001-096000